The Historical and Folklore Museum of Corinth is a museum in Corinth, Greece.

External links
Hellenic Ministry of Culture and Tourism / (in Greek)

History museums in Greece
Folk museums in Greece
Corinth
Museums in Peloponnese (region)